Henry Margenau (April 30, 1901 – February 8, 1997) was a German-American physicist, and philosopher of science.

Biography

Early life
Born in Bielefeld, Germany, Margenau obtained his bachelor's degree from Midland Lutheran College, Nebraska before his M.Sc. from the University of Nebraska in 1926, and PhD from Yale University in 1929.

World War II
Margenau worked on the theory of microwaves and the development of duplexing systems that enabled a single radar antenna both to transmit and receive signals. He also worked on spectral line broadening, a technique used to analyse and review the dynamics of the atomic bombing of Hiroshima.

Philosophy and history  of science
Margenau wrote extensively on science, his works including: Ethics and Science, The Nature of Physical Reality, Quantum Mechanics and Integrative Principles of Modern Thought. He wrote in 1954 the important introduction for the classic book of Hermann von Helmholtz, On the Sensations of Tone.

Free Will

In 1968, Margenau was invited to give the Wimmer Lecture at St. Vincent College in Latrobe, Pennsylvania. His topic was Scientific Indeterminism and Human Freedom. Margenau embraced indeterminism as the first step toward a solution of the problem of human freedom.

Then in 1982, Margenau called his two-stage model of free will a "solution" to what had heretofore had been seen as mere "paradox and illusion." He very neatly separates "free" and "will" in a temporal sequence, as William James had done, naming the two stages simply "chance" followed by "choice."
    "Our thesis is that quantum mechanics leaves our body, our brain, at any moment in a state with numerous (because of its complexity we might say innumerable) possible futures, each with a predetermined probability. Freedom involves two components: chance (existence of a genuine set of alternatives) and choice. Quantum mechanics provides the chance, and we shall argue that only the mind can make the choice by selecting (not energetically enforcing) among the possible future courses."

Religious interests
Margenau served on a commission of the World Council of Churches in developing an ecumenical position on nuclear weapons and atomic warfare.  However, his book The Miracle of Existence (Ox Bow Press, 1984) shows Margenau's broad interests not only in Christianity, but also in Eastern religions and his fascination with finding connections among different religious and philosophical traditions.

Post-war Yale
Margenau was appointed Eugene Higgins Professor of Physics and Natural Philosophy as Yale in 1950, a post he was to hold until his retirement from formal academic life in 1986. He also became a staff member at both the Institute for Advanced Study, Princeton and the MIT Radiation Laboratory. During his working career, he acted as consultant to the U.S. Air Force, the U.S. National Bureau of Standards, Argonne National Laboratory, Rand Corporation, General Electric Co. and Lockheed.

Margenau's work embraced investigation of intermolecular forces, spectroscopy, nuclear physics and electronics. He was also interested in parapsychology. He co-authored parapsychological papers with his friend Lawrence LeShan.

He was married to Liesel Noe and the couple parented two sons and a daughter. Margenau died in Hamden, Connecticut.

Honours and awards
Guggenheim Fellowship
Fulbright Fellowship
William Clyde DeVane Medal from the Yale chapter of Phi Beta Kappa for outstanding teaching and scholarship (1970).

Works

This book and Margenau each receive a mention in a December 28, 1992 Time magazine article: Galileo And Other Faithful Scientists

 1943 1956

See also
Life Science Library
List of science and religion scholars

Notes

External links

Yale obituary
 Henry Margenau on Information Philosopher
  from Margenau to Marshall Warren Nirenberg
(abstract) Negotiating the Boundaries of Science and Religion: The Case of Henry Margenau, William A. Durbin, Zygon, Volume 34, Issue 1, Date: March 1999, Pages: 167-193
(abstract) Beyond Relativism and Foundationalism: a prolegomenon to Future Research in ethics, J. W. Traphagan, Zygon, Volume 29, Issue 2, Date: June 1994, Pages: 153-172

Henry Margenau papers (MS 129). Manuscripts and Archives, Yale University Library. 

1901 births
1997 deaths
American Lutherans
American nuclear physicists
German emigrants to the United States
20th-century American physicists
Historians of science
Manhattan Project people
Midland University alumni
Parapsychologists
Philosophers of science
University of Nebraska–Lincoln alumni
Yale University faculty
20th-century American historians
20th-century Lutherans
Writers about religion and science